66 Drive-In is a historic drive-in theater national historic district located on U.S. Route 66 in Carthage, Jasper County, Missouri. The theater opened on September 22, 1949, four years before the first local television stations signed on in the Joplin-Springfield area. In an era before widespread adoption of transistors and before the invention of integrated circuits, car radios were not standard equipment in all vehicles. The few radios installed in vehicles were of vacuum tube design and power-hungry by modern standards. A series of poles in the car park of the nine-acre site were therefore deployed to hold loudspeakers so that viewers could hear the movie.

When television became a rival to cinema in the 1950s, movie studios went to widescreen format to differentiate their product from broadcast TV; the drive-in's screen was widened sometime after 1953 to accommodate the change in format. A playground was added on-site during the baby boom era.

The cinema was closed in 1985, but was renovated and reopened in 1998. It now shows two movies Friday, Saturday, Sunday every week.

The speakers are now gone, although the poles which once supported them remain.

A drive-in movie venue with many strong similarities to the original 66 Drive-In design (such as the original 4:3 screen aspect ratio, pole-mounted speakers and neon signage on the marquée) appears during the epilogue of Pixar's 2006 film Cars. The fictional drive-in is depicted as screening parody versions of other Pixar feature films.

See also
 List of drive-in theaters

References

External links

National Register of Historic Places
Official site

Historic districts on the National Register of Historic Places in Missouri
Buildings and structures in Jasper County, Missouri
Drive-in theaters in the United States
Cinemas and movie theaters in Missouri
Buildings and structures on U.S. Route 66
Tourist attractions along U.S. Route 66
Rebuilt buildings and structures in the United States
Tourist attractions in Jasper County, Missouri
Theatres on the National Register of Historic Places in Missouri
1949 establishments in Missouri
1985 disestablishments in Missouri
1998 establishments in Missouri
National Register of Historic Places in Jasper County, Missouri
Event venues on the National Register of Historic Places in Missouri
Entertainment companies established in 1949
Entertainment companies disestablished in 1985
Re-established companies
Entertainment companies established in 1998